Lomo or LOMO may refer to:

 Lomo, California (disambiguation)

Food
 Lomo (meat), meat from the loin
 Caña de lomo, Spanish cured pork tenderloin
 Lomo saltado, a Peruvian sauteed dish
 Lomo a lo pobre, a Peruvian and Chilean dish of grilled beef

People
Terje Lømo (born 1935), Norwegian physiologist
Tony Lomo (born 1983), Solomon Islands judoka

Technology
 LOMO, a Russian manufacturer of optical instruments
 Lomo LC-A, a 35mm film camera by LOMO
 Lomography, a style of photography, originally based on the camera